The 2016–17 Loyola Ramblers men's basketball team represented Loyola University Chicago during the 2016–17 NCAA Division I men's basketball season. The Ramblers, led by sixth-year head coach Porter Moser, played their home games at the Joseph J. Gentile Arena in Chicago, Illinois as members of the Missouri Valley Conference. They finished the season 18–14, 8–10 in MVC play to finish in fifth place. They lost to Southern Illinois in the quarterfinals of the MVC tournament.

Previous season
The Ramblers finished the 2015–16 season 15–17, 7–11 in Missouri Valley play to finish in eighth play. They defeated Bradley in the first round of the Missouri Valley tournament to advance to the quarterfinals where they lost to Wichita State.

Offseason

Departures

Incoming transfers

2016 recruiting class

Roster

Schedule and results

|-
!colspan=9 style=| Non-conference regular season

|-
!colspan=9 style=| Missouri Valley regular season

|-
!colspan=9 style=| Missouri Valley tournament

References

Loyola Ramblers men's basketball seasons
Loyola
Loyola Ramblers
Loyola Ramblers